The Abolish the Scottish Parliament Party is a unionist single-issue political party in Scotland. It seeks to abolish the Scottish Parliament, and hand its powers to the Secretary of State for Scotland, Scottish local government, and the UK Parliament.

History 

Although the party was first registered with the Electoral Commission on 31 January 2018, it did not officially launch until 3 August 2020. Its founder and current leader, John Mortimer, previously campaigned for Better Together and established the British Unionist Party. He also stood in the Glasgow electoral region in the 2016 Scottish Parliament election, receiving 2,453 votes. Mortimer was critical of the Scottish Conservatives in comments made to the Daily Record, stating that they "have been weak opposition to the SNP on a number of levels." Despite gaining the backing of former UK Independence Party candidates John Ferguson and Mitch William, Mortimer insisted that the party was not a vehicle for former UKIP voters, although UKIP has endorsed abolishing the Scottish Parliament.

On 31 March 2021, the party announced that they would be contesting each of the eight electoral regions in the 2021 Scottish Parliament election. They endorsed tactical voting similar to other nationalist and unionist parties like Alba and All for Unity. In order to deprive the SNP of a majority or a coalition with the Scottish Greens, they encouraged supporters to give their constituency vote to either the Conservatives, Labour, or the Liberal Democrats, and their list vote to Abolish.

In their first contested election, the 2021 election, the party did not win any seats, achieving 7,262 votes (0.3%).

Policies 
Abolish the Scottish Parliament's single issue is the end of Scottish devolution. They claim that the current devolution system does not resemble what was promised in the 1997 referendum.

On their website they state, "A major 2019 poll showed support for abolishing Holyrood stood at 22%." However, said poll was a UK opinion poll, and not a Scottish one.

They decry the £100 million cost of the parliament as "shocking", pledging instead to spend the funding on the NHS and education. They propose returning executive powers to the Office of the Secretary of State for Scotland, returning legislative powers to the UK Parliament in London with a revival of pre-devolution role of the Scottish Grand Committee, and turning the Holyrood parliament building into a museum for the British Armed Forces. The party supports increasing the number of Scottish MPs to the seventy-four which Scotland had until 1950, elected on a proportional system. The party also opposes what it sees as "damaging, unpopular policies" pursued by the SNP, such as their "Named Person" system and the minimum pricing of alcohol.

Electoral performance

2021 Scottish parliament election

See also 
Abolish the Welsh Assembly Party

References 

Political parties in Scotland
Unionism in Scotland
Single-issue political parties
Political parties established in 2020
2020 establishments in Scotland